Monomorium boltoni is a species of insects of the family Formicidae, the ants. The species is endemic to Cape Verde, where it is restricted to the island of São Nicolau. The species was first described in 1987.

References

External links
Monomorium boltoni - Antweb, accessed April 2013

boltoni
Insects described in 1987
Fauna of São Nicolau, Cape Verde